Pink Saturday is a street party held the Saturday night before San Francisco Pride (Gay Pride Day) in San Francisco's Castro district. It coincides with the annual Dyke March in San Francisco.

Attendees are asked to donate money at the gate. Gate donations in 2008 were around $20,000.

In 2009, the event's estimated attendance was 100,000 people, and cost $150,000.

2010 shooting 
During the 2010 Pink Saturday, on June 26, 19-year-old Stephen Powell was killed after being shot four times in the chest. Two others were injured after being shot in the leg. A 20-year-old man named Ed Perkins was arrested in connection with the shooting. Perkins knew Powell, but did not know the two others. The shooting was not a hate crime, occurred outside the actual Pink Saturday event area, and was reported as gang-related.

See also
 LGBT culture in San Francisco

References

Festivals in the San Francisco Bay Area
LGBT events in California
LGBT culture in San Francisco
Saturday events